10x10 is a 2018 British-American thriller film directed by Suzi Ewing and starring Luke Evans and Kelly Reilly. It was written and produced by Noel Clarke, through his production company Unstoppable Entertainment.

Plot 

The movie starts with a shifty man named Robert Lewis (Luke Evans) watching flower shop owner Cathy Newland (Kelly Reilly) take a seat in a restaurant to eat lunch. He gets up and casually walks by her to wait outside at the car parking lot for her. She exits soon after and goes to her yoga lessons. He parks his car next to her car and kidnaps her when she comes out. He drives to a remote house and locks her in a small (10 by 10) room, which appears to be a cellar. He emphasizes to her that the house is isolated and the cellar is soundproof; there is no way to escape. He tells her that if he wanted to kill her, he already could have.

Cathy gets her bound hands in front of her and attacks him when he comes to get her for lunch. She tries to call the police on the land line but he shoots the phone and so she desperately tries to get free. Unsuccessful, she sits down to eat with him. He asks her name, but attacks her when she answers; they fight and he overpowers her, returning her to the cellar. As he exits the cellar his maid, Alondra, enters the house to be astonished at a disheveled and bleeding Lewis; he had forgotten to tell her to take a day off, but sends her away now.

Cathy lies in the cellar, bleeding and in pain. He returns and questions her. She tells him she already answered him, but he keeps asking for details of her past life, insisting that she is lying. He continues to press her, and she changes her story. She said she studied English and owns a flower shop, but now admits having studied medicine and formerly worked as a nurse.

Flashback to a public trial where several people have died. It transpires that "Cathy" is actually Nathalie Ann Steven, the twin sister to Cathy, who killed herself after their father cheated on their mother with a cheerleader for the football team he worked for as a doctor.

Lewis watches a movie where he cradles a baby (presumedly his own child). In the meantime Nathalie tries to call the police on a mobile phone she had hidden. He rushes in to ask her about the Charleston Three, three patients admitted to the All Angels Hospital in Charleston who died under the nurses’ care, one of whom was his wife, Alana Matthews Lewis. He accuses her of murder since his wife's blood was full of alcohol and the rape drug GHB. She apologizes for Alana's death, and he simply states that he knows that she killed his wife.

He continues to watch films of his little happy family, with his wife Alana and his daughter Summer.

He returns to the cellar to threaten her with his gun. She talks about her childhood in a religious household; how, after their father had left, they were treated like outcasts over the twins’ father had sinned against the family and that her sister committed suicide by hanging in the family’s barn as a result.

Nathalie tells him that she killed these three patients out of vengeance for being sinners (John Lamptey, had two wives, Jane Spencer lied to the police about her husband abusing her for alimony, and Alana cheated on Lewis), but he refuses to believe his wife had cheated on him. He looks for evidence for his wife's infidelity on videos and sees one part in particular where her phone rings, she looks at it impassively and ends the call.

Emotionally overwhelmed, Lewis drives away. He has a brief encounter with police while stopped at a lake, but he is able to quell any suspicions. In the meantime Nathalie tries to remove a broken shard of floor tile to cut open her restraints.

He returns to his house, tells her she had no right to kill his wife before he could talk to her, and demands she go to the police and confess to the Charleston Three Murders case. She says she is now Cathy Newland and won't let him ruin her fresh start of a now-happy life, then attacks him with the floor shard.

He bleeds heavily and tries to lock her into the cellar again but she flees upstairs. Alondra, the maid, comes home with Lewis' daughter Summer, who came home from a sleepover. Nathalie shoots Alondra and takes Summer as hostage. She tells him this can only end with his and his Summer's death, and says Summer is not his biological daughter, since his wife cheated on him.

Summer bites Nathalie and escapes to the cellar, where Lewis finds her.

Summer says Nathalie is gone, and they prepare to leave the house. He takes the recordings from the computer of Nathalie's confessions, and runs to the garage where she corners him. She tries to stab him with a pitchfork, but he drives it upwards to take her off balance and knocks her unconscious. Soon after the police arrive and the nightmare is over.

Lewis hugs Summer and tells her that she is his baby girl, his daughter.

Cast
 Luke Evans as Robert Lewis
 Kelly Reilly as Cathy Newland/Nathalie Ann Steven
 Noel Clarke as Dennis
 Olivia Chenery as Alana Lewis
 Skye Lucia Degruttola as Summer Lewis
 Jill Winternitz as Jen
 Jason Maza as Officer Wayland
 Stacey Hall as Officer Grey
 Norma Dixit as Alondra

Production
The film was shot at West London Film Studios, London, and in Atlanta, Georgia.

Reception 
Noel Murray of the Los Angeles Times praised the performances and twists, but questioned some storytelling choices.

References

External links
 
 
 

2018 films
2018 thriller films
American thriller films
2010s English-language films
Films shot in Atlanta
Films shot in London
Films with screenplays by Noel Clarke
2010s American films